The El Dorado Broncos were a summer collegiate wood-bat baseball club based in El Dorado, Kansas, in the United States, that began as the Hutchinson Broncos in the Victory League in 1970. The Broncos moved from Hutchinson to become the Wichita Broncos in 1985, before moving to El Dorado in 1996. The Broncos won the NBC World Series in 1989, 1990, 1996, 1998 and 2009, and were runner-up in 1987 and 1994.
 The Broncos folded in 2021.

League and tournament wins

1982 Jayhawk League
1983 Jayhawk League
1984 Jayhawk League
1988 Jayhawk League
1989 Jayhawk League
1989 National Baseball Congress World Series
1990 National Baseball Congress World Series
1991 Jayhawk League
1995 Jayhawk League
1996 National Baseball Congress World Series
1998 National Baseball Congress World Series
2004 Jayhawk League
2009 Jayhawk League
2009 National Baseball Congress World Series

MLB alumni

Bob Hansen (Hutchinson Broncos 1971)
Roger Slagle (Hutchinson Broncos 1973–1976) 
Pete Ladd (Hutchinson Broncos 1975–1977)
Jeff Calhoun (Hutchinson Broncos 1977–1978)
Brett Butler (Hutchinson Broncos 1978)
Michael Brown (Hutchinson Broncos 1978) 
Lee Tunnell (Hutchinson Broncos 1979)
Matt Williams (Hutchinson Broncos 1979)
Charlie O'Brien (Hutchinson Broncos 1980)
Barry Lyons (Hutchinson Broncos 1980)
Spike Owen (Hutchinson Broncos 1981)
Doug Baker (Hutchinson Broncos 1981)
Steve Ontiveros (Hutchinson Broncos 1981)
Mike Capel (Hutchinson Broncos 1981)
Pete Dalena (Hutchinson Broncos 1981)
Roger Clemens (Hutchinson Broncos 1982)
Bryan Oelkers (Hutchinson Broncos 1982)
Roger McDowell (Hutchinson Broncos 1982)
Tracy Jones (Hutchinson Broncos 1982)
Dan Plesac (Hutchinson Broncos 1982–1983)
Greg Mathews (Hutchinson Broncos 1982)
Ray Hayward (Hutchinson Broncos 1982)
Don Wakamatsu (Hutchinson Broncos 1982)
Mike Dunne (Hutchinson Broncos 1982)
Dave Clark (Hutchinson Broncos 1983)
Jeff Brantley (Hutchinson Broncos 1983)
Marvin Freeman (Hutchinson Broncos 1983)
Dan Radison (Hutchinson Broncos manager 1983)
Rafael Palmeiro (Hutchinson Broncos 1983–1984)
Barry Bonds (Hutchinson Broncos 1984)
Pete Incaviglia (Hutchinson Broncos 1984)
Rick Wrona (Hutchinson Broncos 1984)
Mike Macfarlane (Hutchinson Broncos 1984)
Joe Magrane (Hutchinson Broncos 1984)
Mike Stanley (Hutchinson Broncos 1984)
Nate Robertson (El Dorado Broncos 1996 & 1998)
Heath Bell (El Dorado Broncos 1997)
Rusty Ryal (El Dorado Broncos 2003)

References

Amateur baseball teams in Kansas
Baseball teams established in 1970
Baseball teams in Kansas